Adam Black  (20 February 178424 January 1874) was a Scottish publisher and politician. He founded the A & C Black publishing company, and published the 7th, 8th and 9th editions of the Encyclopædia Britannica.

Life
Black was born in Charles Street, Edinburgh, the son of Isabella Nicol and Charles Black, a master builder. He was educated at the Royal High School and the University of Edinburgh. After serving as an apprentice to Mr Fairbairn, an Edinburgh bookseller, he began business for himself in Edinburgh in 1808. By 1826 he was recognised as one of the principal booksellers in the city; and a few years later he was joined in business by his nephew Charles.

In 1827 he purchased the copyright of the Encyclopædia Britannica, along with co-investors Macvey Napier and James Browne LLD. In this capacity he became publisher of the esteemed volume and produced the 7th, 8th and 9th editions of the Encyclopædia Britannica. He also negotiated the purchase of the stock and copyright of the Waverley Novels. .

In 1817 he relocated his bookshop to 27 North Bridge in the Old Town and in 1832 his home is given as 30 Broughton Place in the eastern New Town. In 1851 the firm bought the copyright of the Waverley Novels for £27,000, and in 1861 they became the proprietors of De Quincey's works.

Adam Black was twice Lord Provost of Edinburgh, and represented the city in parliament from 1856 to 1865. 

He retired from business in 1865, and lived his final years at 38 Drummond Place in the New Town. He died on 24 January 1874. He was succeeded by his sons, who removed their business in 1895 to London. In 1877 a bronze statue by John Hutchison of Adam Black was erected in East Princes Street Gardens, Edinburgh. He is buried in Warriston Cemetery on the outer face of the catacombs close to James Young Simpson.

Family

Black was married to Isabella Tait (1796–1877). Their children included Charles Bertram Black (1821–1906), Francis Black (1830–1892) and Adam William Black (1836–1898).

His granddaughter, Eda Lawrie married the botanist Robert John Harvey Gibson.

Trained under Black

William Durham FRSE (18341893) was apprenticed under Black.

References

Further reading
Alexander Nicolson, ed., Memoirs of Adam Black (2nd ed., Edinburgh, 1885).

External links 
 

1784 births
1874 deaths
Politicians from Edinburgh
People educated at the Royal High School, Edinburgh
Alumni of the University of Edinburgh
Burials at Warriston Cemetery
Fellows of the Royal Society of Edinburgh
Lord Provosts of Edinburgh
Members of the Parliament of the United Kingdom for Edinburgh constituencies
Publishers (people) from Edinburgh
Scottish tax resisters
Scottish encyclopedists
UK MPs 1852–1857
UK MPs 1857–1859
UK MPs 1859–1865
Scottish booksellers
Scottish Liberal Party MPs
19th-century British businesspeople